The Association of Independent Music (AIM) is a non-profit trade body established in 1998 by UK independent record labels to represent the independent record sector, which in 2016 constituted approximately 23% of the UK market. Its members include record labels, self-releasing artists and distributors.

It runs Indie-Con, an annual conference for the independent music industry.

History
Alison Wenham  founded AIM in 1999, and spent 17 years as its chair and CEO. She moved on to become CEO of Worldwide Independent Network (WIN) in 2016, which she had helped to found in 2006 and been involved with ever since. As a driving force in helping indie labels being able to compete worldwide with bigger companies, Wenham  featured in Billboard’s "Top Women in Music" every year since publication.

In 2004, AIM featured in the press over their contract negotiations with Apple for rights to distribute their labels' content on the iTunes service. AIM was ultimately successful in negotiating equivalent terms for its independent labels members that Apple had originally only offered to the 'major' labels.

In September 2008, AIM became a founding member of UK Music, which represents all aspects of the UK music industry.

In November 2016 AIM appointed Paul Pacifico as CEO.

The 2016 WINTEL report showed that the indie sector constituted about 23% of total market share.

On 24 September 2018, Pacifico co-represented IMPALA, the body representing European indie record labels, at the expert workshop organised by the Centre for Fine Arts in Brussels (BOZAR), the European Cultural Foundation and the British Council about Brexit and the cultural sector. The goal was "to reaffirm our shared intent and common values, and to produce practical recommendations from the cultural and creative sectors that go beyond those that have already been made", and a list of recommendations was afterwards published on the IMPALA website.

AIM Awards
The AIM Independent Music Awards are hosted by the Association of Independent Music (AIM) and were established in 2011 to recognize artists signed to independent record labels in the United Kingdom. Award categories include:
 Best Small Label
 Best 'Difficult' 2nd Album
 Special Catalogue Release of the Year
 Hardest Working Band or Artist
 Golden Welly Award for Best Independent Festival
 Independent Breakthrough of the Year
 Indie Champion Award
 Independent Video of the Year
 Best Live Act
 Independent Track of the Year
 Independent Album of the Year
 Independent Label of the Year
 PPL Awards for Most Played New independent Act
 Innovator Award
 Pioneer Award
 Outstanding Contribution to Music Award

The 2018 awards were held in partnership with Young Urban Arts Foundation and saw bands and labels like IDLES, Let's Eat Grandma and Partisan Records nominated.

Indie-Con
The inaugural music industry conference, the AIM Indie-Con took place in 2012 in the Glaziers Hall London, returning there each year until at least 2018. The inaugural music industry conference, Indie-Con took place in 2012 in the Glaziers Hall London, returning there each year until at least 2018.

Aim Connected
The Association of Independent Music launched a new networking event in 2019, called Aim Connected. Spread over three days in March, the event strives to connect business, tech and people. The event includes industry expert panels, workshops and one-on-one networking sessions. Aim Connected's 2019 speakers included executive producer of 'Surviving R. Kelly' dream Hampton, London's Night Czar Amy Lame, Hospital Records founder Chris Goss, and VICE creative director, Emil Asmussen.

Unrelated Australian version
From 2017, a separate event known as Indie-Con Australia has been run in Adelaide, under the auspices of the Australian Independent Record Labels Association (AIR), with support from the South Australian government.

Significant labels under AIM

 Beggars Group
 Domino Records
 Grand Central
 Independiente
 4AD Records
 Ninja Tune
 XL Recordings
 Warp
 Lucky Me
 Young
 Bella Union Records
 Transgressive Records
 Heavy Metal Records
 Revolver Music
 Because Music

Significant artists under AIM labels

 Adele
 Arctic Monkeys
 Brightblack Morning Light
 Basement Jaxx
 Billy Bragg
 Cocteau Twins
 Coldcut
 Cornershop
 Dizzee Rascal
 Dogs Die in Hot Cars
 Echo & the Bunnymen
 Elbow
 Fingathing
 Frank Turner
 Franz Ferdinand
 Grandaddy
 Kate Rogers
 Laika
 Liberty X
 London Elektricity
 Maxïmo Park
 Mr. Scruff
 Paul Weller
 Rae & Christian
 Richard Thompson
 Roots Manuva
 Seafood
 Stereophonics
 The Church
 The Orb
 The Prodigy
 The White Stripes
 Tindersticks
 Underworld

References

Further reading
 Indie Spirit of Things: Alison Wenham on Protecting her Flock – [PIAS]'s Blog, 29 June 2015
 Alison Wenham bio (IMPALA)

External links
 

Communications and media organisations based in the United Kingdom
Music organisations based in the United Kingdom